Nick Nevern  (born 8 December 1980) is a British actor, screenwriter and director. He is best known for his roles in Eastenders first as Rennie, then as Don , Shameless as Rogowski,and The Hooligan Factory as Dex.

Early life
Nevern was born and raised in London, England. His mother is Russian.

Career
Nevern spent some time in Russia, returning years later to London where he started his acting career, with a first television performance in Dream Team as Pavel Kovac and since appearing in several other shows such as EastEnders, Jonathan Creek, Shameless and Motherland.

Nevern played the main character in the 2012 independent film The Rise and Fall of a White Collar Hooligan and two of the film's sequels.

In 2014, Nevern wrote, directed, produced and starred in The Hooligan Factory, a spoof film of football hooliganism. The film heavily parodies titles from the British hooligan genre films and focuses mainly on The Firm, along with The Football Factory, Rise of the Footsoldier, I.D., Green Street and Cass.

In 2020, Nevern directed the fifth film in the Rise of the Footsoldier franchise, titled Rise of the Footsoldier: Origins.

In 2022, Nevern directed the next film in the Footsoldier series, titled Tate: Ten Days of Blood. On 2 November 2022, it was announced that Nevern had joined the cast of EastEnders as Don, the ex boyfriend of Sam Mitchell played by Kim Medcalf. His first episode aired on 8 November 2022.

Personal life
On 3 December 2021, Nevern announced he was going to be a father. His daughter was born on 28 May 2022.

Filmography

Film

Television

Video games

Theatre

References

External links 
 

1980 births
Living people
English people of Russian descent
English male film actors
English male television actors
English male video game actors
Male actors from London